Víctor José Terrazas Martínez (born February 11, 1983) is a Mexican professional boxer and a former WBC super bantamweight champion.

Professional career

Terrazas turned professional in 2003 and would lose his first fight to Adrian Tellez by second round stoppage. He worked his way up to a world title eliminator in 2010 against British boxer Rendall Munroe. In the fight he would lose his first fight in seven years by ninth round stoppage.

On November 19, 2011 Terrazas upset former world champion Fernando Montiel, to win the WBC Silver Super bantamweight Championship.

In April 2013, Terrazas defeated Christian Mijares in a close split-decision to win the vacant WBC super bantamweight title vacated by Abner Mares. Terrazas won despite being knocked down in the 12th round.

In August 2013 Terrazas would lose the title in his first defence against Leo Santa Cruz via third-round technical knockout in Los Angeles.

Professional boxing record

See also
List of world super-bantamweight boxing champions
List of Mexican boxing world champions

References

External links

 

|-

1983 births
Living people
Mexican male boxers
Boxers from Jalisco
Sportspeople from Guadalajara, Jalisco
Super-bantamweight boxers
Featherweight boxers
Super-featherweight boxers
World super-bantamweight boxing champions
World Boxing Council champions